The 2013 Vuelta a España was the 68th edition of the race. Chris Horner won the 2013 Vuelta at the age of 41 on 15 September 2013, becoming the oldest ever Grand Tour winner.
Horner beat his nearest challenger, Italian Vincenzo Nibali, by finishing ahead of him in each of the final three mountainous stages before the final stage into Madrid.

This Vuelta started in Galicia on August 24, 2013. The race spent 5 days in Galicia, then continued anticlockwise touring Spain through Castile and León, Extremadura, Andalusia, Aragon, Catalonia, La Rioja, Cantabria, and Asturias, before returning to Madrid for the finish on September 15. The Vuelta included excursions into two neighboring countries, Andorra and France. The top three stage winners received the following bonuses in the general classification: 10 seconds for winners of the stages, six seconds for runners-up, and four seconds for those in third place.

Teams

The 19 UCI World Tour teams were automatically entitled to start the race; three wildcard teams were also invited.

†: Invited Pro-continental teams

Stages

Race overview
For in-depth details see 2013 Vuelta a España, Stage 1 to Stage 11 and 2013 Vuelta a España, Stage 12 to Stage 21

Stage one was a team time trial (TTT) which was won by Astana and resulted in Janez Brajkovič being awarded the red jersey. Stage two was won by Vincenzo Nibali who also took over the red jersey, but on the next stage Chris Horner would win and claim the lead.

The race would eventually evolve into a battle between Horner and Nibali, who was attempting to win a very rare Grand Tour Double as he had won the Giro a few months earlier. Horner meanwhile was more of an outside contender for victory and prior to the start of this Vuelta he had more or less acknowledged this by announcing during a team meeting that he could finish top 10. Privately however, he told his wife and friends that he could podium as he felt he was in very good form following the 2013 Tour of Utah. After winning on stage three he told his team he could podium and told his wife he could win. Daniel Moreno would win stage four as Nibali would win back the jersey and hold it for the next few stages.

Leopold König would win stage eight by one second over Daniel Moreno resulting in Nicolas Roche taking over the race lead. In stage nine Moreno would not be denied as he won his second stage, this one by four seconds, as he also took the red jersey from Roche by one second. Meanwhile, Nibali, Horner, former Vuelta champ Alejandro Valverde and Joaquim Rodríguez were all within a minute of the lead.

Until this point in the race Directeur Sportif for Team Radioshack José Azevedo had considered Horner's statement declaring he could make the podium, but still ran the team with the plan he had come into the race with. Only after Horner won again on stage ten and reclaimed the red jersey did he declare full team support for the American for the rest of the race. Stage eleven was an individual time trial where Nibali put time into all of the riders close to him in the standings reclaiming the red jersey yet again.

Once again Nibali would maintain the lead for the next several stages. In stage eighteen Vasil Kiryienka would win the day as Horner took +0:25 out of Nibali to come within just three seconds of the lead. Stage nineteen saw the riders contend with the Monte Naranco where Rodríguez won the stage and pulled within a minute of Valverde for the final podium position. Horner took another six seconds from Nibali and reclaimed the red jersey by three seconds, but for all intents and purposes they were neck and neck going into the final mountain stage, which culminated on the Alto de l'Angliru. Rodríguez and Valverde were not far behind going into this decisive stage and if Nibali and Horner were to attack one another to the breaking point, either of these two riders could be in a position to steal the race. Horner was concerned about Nibali being considerably stronger than he was in the final sprint to the finish so his plan was to defeat him on the mountain. Nibali also intended to win on the mountain and he did attack Horner on numerous occasions, but Horner was able to seal his only grand tour victory by responding to every attack and eventually riding away from everyone except for the final surviving breakaway rider in Kenny Elissonde.

Classification leadership table
There were four main classifications contested in the 2013 Vuelta a España, with the most important being the general classification. The general classification was calculated by adding each cyclist's finishing times on each stage. The cyclist with the least accumulated time was the race leader, identified by the red jersey; the winner of this classification was considered the winner of the Vuelta. In 2013, there were time bonuses given on mass-start stages; ten seconds were awarded to the stage winner, with six for second and four for third.

Additionally, there was a points classification, which awards a green jersey. In the points classification, cyclists get points for finishing among the best in a stage finish, or in intermediate sprints. The cyclist with the most points led the classification, and is identified with a green jersey. There was also a mountains classification. The organisation categorised some climbs as either hors catégorie, first, second, third, or fourth-category; points for this classification were won by the first cyclists that reach the top of these climbs, with more points available for the higher-categorised climbs. The cyclist with the most points led the classification, and was identified with a blue polka dot jersey.

The fourth individual classification was the combination classification, marked by the white jersey. This classification is calculated by adding the numeral ranks of each cyclist in the general, points and mountains classifications – a rider must have a score in all classifications possible to qualify for the combination classification – with the lowest cumulative total signifying the winner of this competition.

For the team classification, the times of the best three cyclists per team on each stage were added; the leading team is the team with the lowest total time. For the combativity award, a jury gives points after each stage to the cyclists they considered most combative. The cyclist with the most votes in all stages leads the classification. For the daily combative winner, the rider in question donned a dossard with a red background, on the following stage.

Classification standings

General classification

Points classification

King of the Mountains classification

Combination classification

Team classification

References

External links

 Official website

 
2013 in Spanish road cycling
2013 UCI World Tour
2013